Kyrgyz tuusu is the oldest Kyrgyz language newspaper in Kyrgyzstan. It was first published as Erkin Too in Tashkent on November 7, 1924. From August 1927 it was known as Kyzyl Kyrgyzstan (Red Kyrgyzstan), and from 1956 - Sovettik Kyrgyzstan (Soviet Kyrgyzstan). The newspaper received its current name in 1991.

See also 
 List of newspapers in Kyrgyzstan

External links 
 

Newspapers published in Kyrgyzstan
Kyrgyz-language newspapers
Newspapers established in 1924
1924 establishments in the Soviet Union